The 2016 NRL State Championship was a Rugby League match held between the winners of the 2016 Intrust Super Premiership NSW and the 2016 Queensland Cup. It was the third edition following the 2015 NRL State Championship, and was played before the 2016 NRL Grand Final.

Background 
For the 2015 NRL State Championship, the Illawarra Cutters won the NSW Cup by defeating the Minor Premiers Mount Pritchard Mounties 21-20 in the Grand Final. The Burleigh Bears won the QLD Cup by defeating the Redcliffe Dolphins 26-16 in the Grand Final.

Match Details

See also

2016 New South Wales Cup season
2016 Queensland Cup season

References

External links
2016 Queensland Cup
2016 New South Wales Cup

2016 in rugby league
Burleigh Bears
Illawarra Cutters
Rugby league club matches